Dom Shahr (also Romanized as Domshahr; also known as Dovom Shahr and Dumshehr) is a village in Gurband Rural District, in the Central District of Minab County, Hormozgan Province, Iran. At the 2006 census, its population was 1,806, in 383 families.

References 

Populated places in Minab County